Elections to Armagh District Council were held on 17 May 1989 on the same day as the other Northern Irish local government elections. The election used four district electoral areas to elect a total of 22 councillors.

Election results

Note: "Votes" are the first preference votes.

Districts summary

|- class="unsortable" align="centre"
!rowspan=2 align="left"|Ward
! % 
!Cllrs
! % 
!Cllrs
! %
!Cllrs
! %
!Cllrs
! % 
!Cllrs
!rowspan=2|TotalCllrs
|- class="unsortable" align="center"
!colspan=2 bgcolor="" | UUP
!colspan=2 bgcolor="" | SDLP
!colspan=2 bgcolor="" | DUP
!colspan=2 bgcolor="" | Sinn Féin
!colspan=2 bgcolor="white"| Others
|-
|align="left"|Armagh City
|29.6
|2
|bgcolor="#99FF66"|43.0
|bgcolor="#99FF66"|3
|10.4
|0
|13.3
|1
|3.7
|0
|6
|-
|align="left"|Crossmore
|36.7
|2
|bgcolor="#99FF66"|54.3
|bgcolor="#99FF66"|3
|0.0
|0
|9.1
|0
|0.0
|0
|5
|-
|align="left"|Cusher
|bgcolor="40BFF5"|60.5
|bgcolor="40BFF5"|4
|15.1
|1
|18.9
|1
|4.3
|0
|1.2
|0
|6
|-
|align="left"|The Orchard
|bgcolor="40BFF5"|55.6
|bgcolor="40BFF5"|3
|20.9
|1
|16.5
|1
|7.0
|0
|0.0
|0
|5
|- class="unsortable" class="sortbottom" style="background:#C9C9C9"
|align="left"| Total
|46.6
|11
|31.7
|8
|12.2
|2
|8.2
|1
|1.3
|0
|22
|-
|}

District results

Armagh City

1985: 2 x SDLP, 2 x UUP, 1 x Sinn Féin, 1 x DUP
1989: 3 x SDLP, 2 x UUP, 1 x Sinn Féin
1985-1989 Change: SDLP gain from DUP

Crossmore

1985: 3 x SDLP, 2 x UUP
1989: 3 x SDLP, 2 x UUP
1985-1989 Change: No change

Cusher

1985: 4 x UUP, 1 x SDLP, 1 x DUP
1989: 4 x UUP, 1 x SDLP, 1 x DUP
1985-1989 Change: No change

The Orchard

1985: 3 x UUP, 1 x SDLP, 1 x DUP
1989: 3 x UUP, 1 x SDLP, 1 x DUP
1985-1989 Change: No change

References

Armagh City and District Council elections
Armagh